The End of Time is a 2017 experimental short by Milcho Manchevski, a U.S.-Cuban co-production.

Background
The End of Time is an experimental film about that one hypnotic moment on a regular, unassuming Tuesday when one realizes that time has stopped and the universe has been sucked into a single smile.

Principal photography took place in San Antonio de los Baños, Cuba. Post-production was completed in New York City and Macedonia.  
Cinematography by Alain López Martínez, edited by Kristina Pozenel, music and sound design by Igor Vasilev Novogradska, visual effects by Misho Ristov Rex, and color grading by Michael Dwass.

The End of Time premiered at Aspen Shortsfest, recognized as one of the premier Oscar-qualifying short film festivals in the world where it won the Ellen Award. It has since played a number of international festivals, winning 7 awards, and gaining worldwide distribution.

This is what the critics had to say about The End of Time:
THE END OF TIME is an impressive minimalist phenomenology of time, consciousness and selfhood. Subtle art stratification of the awareness of the duration of a multitude of timelines within a film frame and the distillation of a pure emotion. A sunny Cuban afternoon on a street in San Antonio de los Baños, the fictitious mise-en-scène gradually breaks down, fragmenting into a crystalline pictorial structure with a disrhythmic duration of the whole, a micro-image archipelago with unequal deceleration of the parts. The quest for a fixed point hypnotizes and displaces the normal conditions of the perception of time.

THE END OF TIME, a winner of the prestigious Ellen Award at one of the most renowned short film festivals in Aspen, as well as the award at the Jihlava International Documentary Film Festival in Czech Republic, is incredibly attractive cinematic and artistic playfulness, an experimental transcendental journey to something we are very familiar with, but in the same time remains very difficult to grasp, to those rare and timeless moments when we feel truly ourselves, truly at home.

(Dejan Zdravkov, FFF 2018)

Festivals and awards
 Tirana Film Festival - Best Art Video and Experimental Film
 San Gio Film Festival - Best Editor
 Aspen Shortfest - Ellen Award 
 Arizona Film Festival
 Palm Springs International Shortfest
 Short Shorts Film Festival and Asia 
 Festival International du Film Nancy Lorraine 
 Festival International de Curtametraxes de Bueu 
 Odense International Film Festival OFF17
 Festival International du film Nancy-Lorraine 
 Oaxaca Film Festival
 Buffalo International Film Festival
 68th Montecatini International Short Film Festival
 Manaki Brothers International Cinematographer's Film Festival
 São Paulo International Film Festival
 St. Louis International Film Festival
 Ji.hlava International Documentary Film Festival - Special Mention 
 Bogota International Short Film Festival
 Alternative Film/Video Festival
 Berlin Experimental Film Festival 
 Minimalen Short Film Festival

Additional Screenings

 Manchevski's "Dreaming a Wu Yan Poem" art exhibition - Shanghai,China 
 Manchevski's Master Class at Herceg Novi International Film Festival, Montenegro
 Milcho Manchevski retrospective at the International Motivational Film Festival - Bridge of Arts, Rostov on Don, Russia
 Kino Palais Buenos Aires 
 Kultivator Kino Karposh

References

External links

2017 films
American short films
Cuban avant-garde and experimental films
Films directed by Milcho Manchevski